Dorset Street was a street in Spitalfields, East London, once  situated at the heart of the area's rookery. By repute it was "the worst street in London", and it was the scene of the brutal  murder of Mary Jane Kelly by Jack the Ripper on 9 November 1888. The murder was committed at Kelly's lodgings which were situated at No. 13, Miller's Court, entered from a passageway between 26 and 27, Dorset Street.

The road was renamed Duval Street in 1904, before having its north side demolished in 1928 during the rebuilding of Old Spitalfields Market, and the buildings on the south side replaced by a car park in the 1960s. The site was built over during redevelopment of the Fruit and Wool Exchange in the 2010s.

History
Laid out in 1674 and originally known as "Datchet Street" (probably from William Wheler of Datchet, who owned land in the area), it was given the name Dorset Street soon after. Locally, it was sometimes known as "Dosset Street" or "Dossen Street" either because of the large number of doss-houses it contained or because immigrants to the area found it hard to pronounce the original name. It was a short and narrow street, 400 feet long and 24 feet wide, running parallel with Brushfield Street, to the north, and White's Row, to the south, and connecting Crispin Street, to the west, with Commercial Street to the east. An alley called Little Paternoster Row connected Dorset Street with Brushfield Street.  In the mid-nineteenth century a man called John Miller built some cottages in the back gardens of his properties at 26 and 27, on the north side of Dorset Street. This small area, entered by a passageway between 26 and 27, became known as Miller's Court. No 13 Miller's Court, where Mary Jane Kelly resided and was murdered, was originally the back part of 26 Dorset Street, renumbered and let as a separate residence by her landlord Jack McCarthy and now looking out onto the cottage buildings in the Court rather than the original garden.

By the 1880s, Dorset Street was almost entirely taken up with common lodging-houses and other sub-standard rented accommodation, mostly let and controlled by two men, Jack McCarthy and William Crossingham. McCarthy and Crossingham were major slum landlords in this area and suspected to be involved in various illegal rackets, such as controlling prostitutes, fencing stolen goods, and arranging prize fights. Reportedly, the "lowest of all prostitutes" plied their trade on Dorset Street, and some common lodging-houses were actually brothels.

Only two legitimate businesses were listed in the Post Office Street Directory for 1888: that of Barnett Price, who had a grocery store at No 7, and the Blue Coat Boy public house, which was run by William James Turner at No 32. It was estimated that on any one night there were no fewer than 1,200 men sleeping in Dorset Street's crowded lodging houses. 

On the corner of Dorset and Commercial Street stood The Britannia public house. Known as the "Ringers", after the landlord's surname: a frequent customer was Mary Jane Kelly. Situated opposite Miller's Court, at No. 15, was Crossingham's common lodging-house, with another, also owned by Crossingham, at the corner of Little Paternoster Row, at 35, Dorset Street. It was from this common lodging house that Ripper victim Annie Chapman was last seen walking up Little Paternoster Row, before turning right into Brushfield Street and heading towards Christ Church, Spitalfields. 

In 1901, Frederick Arthur McKenzie in the Daily Mail said of Dorset Street:

 
Dorset Street remained a notorious slum following the murder of Mary Jane Kelly. In 1901, Mary Ann Austin was murdered with ten wounds to her abdomen at Annie Chapman's former home, Crossingham's Lodging House, at 35, Dorset Street. Later, in 1909 there was a Jack the Ripper-like killing in No. 20, Miller's Court, the room directly above no. 13 (which had been occupied by Elizabeth Prater in 1888), when a young woman named Kitty Ronan was found with her throat cut. It was believed that Ronan was a prostitute, and, as in the killing of Mary Jane Kelly, her murderer was never found. As in 1888, the landlord of Miller's Court in 1909 was still John McCarthy. The last murder in Dorset Street was the gangland killing of a Soho club manager and a former middleweight boxer called Selwyn Cooney in February 1960. Cooney was shot in the head at a drinking club on the street, after which he staggered down the stairs into the road and died.

A vivid description of crime and vice in Dorset Street is given in Ralph L. Finn's 1963 memoir of a Jewish boyhood in the East End:

"Worst street in London"
George Duckworth, investigating London poverty on behalf of Charles Booth in 1898, described Dorset Street as "the worst street I have seen so far, thieves, prostitutes, bullies, all common lodging houses". McKenzie's 1901 article in the Daily Mail was titled "The Worst Street in London". Fiona Rule subsequently adopted this phrase as the title of her 2008 book on the history of the street.

Later history and redevelopment
 
As Finn indicates, by the early years of the twentieth century Dorset Street constituted a small non-Jewish ghetto in what was now largely a Jewish area. Dorset Street was renamed "Duval Street" on 28 June 1904. In 1920, the Corporation of London purchased Spitalfields Market, and began major rebuilding, which included the demolition of the whole of the north side of Duval Street, including Miller's Court. The new fruit market opened in 1928. Another new market development in the 1960s resulted in Duval Street becoming a lorry park for the market. The buildings on the south side of Dorset Street were redeveloped as a multi-storey car park in 1969–1971. The north side was bounded by the London Fruit and Wool Exchange building, which in later years was used primarily as office space for small businesses and a storage warehouse for an import-export company.

Redevelopment of the Fruit and Wool Exchange in the 2010s saw the Dorset Street site built over. As part of the redevelopment, archaeological excavations were carried out in 2015–2016. These revealed the truncated remains of numbers 7–12 and 15 Dorset Street (all on the south side of the street), several cesspits and soakaways (brick-lined and horncore-lined), and significant assemblages of ceramic, glass, metal and other fragments dating from the late 17th to mid-19th centuries. The finds included, in one of the cesspits, a group of up to 29 decorative ceramic figurines, tentatively associated with the pottery and glass retail outlet of Thomas Wedgwood (1800–1864; nephew of Josiah Wedgwood), which was based at 40 Dorset Street from 1826 to 1850. Also found were 21 human burials from the extramural northern cemetery of Roman Londinium.

Cultural references
The history of Dorset Street is referred to in chapter 2 of Alan Moore and Eddie Campbell's graphic novel From Hell (1989–1998).

References

Sources

External links
Dorset Street on the Whitechapel Society website
Dorset Street on the Casebook:Jack the Ripper website
Murder of Mary Ann Austin, The National Archives

Jack the Ripper
Streets in the London Borough of Tower Hamlets
Spitalfields